Gongnong is a town under the administration of Lizhou District, Guangyuan, Sichuan, China. , it has 2 residential communities and 10 villages under its administration.

References 

Township-level divisions of Sichuan
Lizhou District